Irumbuzhi is a village situated adjacent to Malappuram Municipality. It is part of Anakkayam panchayath, Malappuram district, Kerala state, India. 
 It is on the banks of the Kadalundi River.

Culture
Irumbuzhi village is a predominantly Muslim populated area.  Hindus exist in comparatively smaller numbers.  So the culture of the locality is based upon Muslim traditions.  Duff Muttu, Kolkali and Aravanamuttu are common folk arts of this locality.  There are many libraries attached to mosques giving a rich source of Islamic studies.  Most of the books are written in Arabi-Malayalam which is a version of the Malayalam language written in Arabic script.  People gather in mosques for the evening prayer and continue to sit there after the prayers discussing social and cultural issues.  Business and family issues are also sorted out during these evening meetings.  The Hindu minority of this area keeps their rich traditions by celebrating various festivals in their temples.  Hindu rituals are done here with a regular devotion like other parts of Kerala. Vadakkummuri, padinjattummuri etc are some major identified places in this village.

Transportation
Irumbuzhi village is well connected via road through Malappuram. It is on the Malappuram - Manjeri road. Frequent buses are available to both the sides. 
The nearest airport is at Karipur.
The nearest major railway station is at Tirur.

References

Villages in Malappuram district
Manjeri